The 2022 ITS Cup was a professional tennis tournament played on outdoor clay courts. It was the thirteenth edition of the tournament which was part of the 2022 ITF Women's World Tennis Tour. It took place in Olomouc, Czech Republic between 18 and 24 July 2022.

Champions

Singles

  Sára Bejlek def.  Lina Gjorcheska, 6–2, 7–6(7–0)

Doubles

  Giulia Gatto-Monticone /  Sada Nahimana def.  Ilona Georgiana Ghioroaie /  Oana Georgeta Simion, 6–1, 1–6, [10–5]

Singles main draw entrants

Seeds

 1 Rankings are as of 11 July 2022.

Other entrants
The following players received wildcards into the singles main draw:
  Natálie Augustinová
  Linda Klimovičová
  Lucie Petruželová
  Julie Štruplová
  Darja Viďmanová

The following player received entry using a protected ranking:
  Antonia Lottner

The following players received entry from the qualifying draw:
  Çağla Büyükakçay
  Melanie Klaffner
  Bojana Klincov
  Gabriela Knutson
  Eszter Méri
  Julia Middendorf
  Tayisiya Morderger
  Victoria Muntean

References

External links
 2022 ITS Cup at ITFtennis.com
 Official website

2022 ITF Women's World Tennis Tour
2022 in Czech sport
July 2022 sports events in the Czech Republic